Marilyn Nancy Lorch Geller (born 1944) is an American biostatistician, the director of biostatistics research at the National Heart, Lung, and Blood Institute and a former president of the American Statistical Association.

Education
Geller studied mathematics at the City College of New York, graduating in 1965. She then went to Case Western Reserve University for graduate study in mathematics, earning a master's degree in 1967 and completing her doctorate in 1972. Although she had enjoyed probability theory as an undergraduate, and entered graduate school intending to study the same subject, she ended up doing her graduate work in statistics.
Her dissertation, supervised by Lajos Takács, was On distribution of Some Kolmogrov-Smirnov Type Statistics.

Career
Geller took faculty positions in statistics at the University of Rochester from 1970 to 1972 and the Wharton School of the University of Pennsylvania from 1972 to 1978. Uninterested in economics, she moved again to do biostatistics at the Medical College of Pennsylvania from 1978 to 1979 and the Memorial Sloan-Kettering Cancer Center from 1979 to 1990, when she took her position at the National Heart, Lung, and Blood Institute.

She served as president of the American Statistical Association for 2011.

Awards and honors
Geller became a fellow of the American Statistical Association in 1993.
She is the 2009 winner of the Janet L. Norwood Award For Outstanding Achievement By A Woman In The Statistical Sciences.

References

1944 births
Living people
American statisticians
Women statisticians
City College of New York alumni
Case Western Reserve University alumni
University of Rochester faculty
Wharton School of the University of Pennsylvania faculty
Woman's Medical College of Pennsylvania faculty
Fellows of the American Statistical Association
Presidents of the American Statistical Association